Mark Robert Klicker (born March 26, 1963) is an American businessman and politician who is a member of the Washington House of Representatives for the 16th district. Elected in 2020, he assumed office on January 11, 2021.

Early life and education 
Klicker was born and raised in Walla Walla, Washington. As a child, he worked on his family's ranch in the Walla Walla Valley agricultural region. Klicker earned an Associate degree from Walla Walla Community College.

Career 
Klicker has worked as a licensed realtor and founded the Urban, Farm and Forest Group, a real estate investment and development company that specializes in rural projects. Klicker also served as the president of the Washington Farm Bureau. Klicker previously owned Klicker Enterprises Asphalt Seal Coat Company and Alpha Omega Klicker Cherries.

After incumbent representative Bill Jenkin announced that he would not seek re-election to the Washington House of Representatives, Klicker announced his candidacy to succeed him. Klicker defeated Democrat Frances Chvatal in the nonpartisan blanket primary and November general election.

Personal life 
Klicker's wife is Lisa Klicker. They have three children. Klicker and his family live in Walla Walla, Washington.

References 

Living people
People from Walla Walla, Washington
People from Walla Walla County, Washington
Businesspeople from Washington (state)
Walla Walla Community College alumni
Republican Party members of the Washington House of Representatives
1963 births